Nilla is a brand name owned by Nabisco that is most closely associated with its line of vanilla-flavored, wafer-style cookies. The name is a shortened version of vanilla, the flavor profile common to all Nilla-branded products. Originally sold as Nabisco Vanilla Wafers, the product's name was changed in 1967 to the abbreviated form Nilla Wafer.

The original Nilla product is the Nilla wafer, a round, thin, light wafer cookie made with flour, sugar, shortening, and eggs. Originally flavored with real vanilla, Nilla wafers have been primarily flavored with synthetic vanillin since at least 1994, a change which prompted some criticism. Presently, Nilla wafers are described as having "natural and artificial flavor", according to the ingredients list on the box.

Nilla also produces a variety of spin-off products, including pie crusts. The crusts were first introduced in 1992 alongside pie crusts flavored like two other Nabisco cookie brands, Oreos and Honey Grahams.

History 
The recipe for vanilla wafers or sugar wafers was first invented in the late 19th century by German-American confectioner Gustav A. Mayer on Staten Island. He sold his recipe to Nabisco, and Nabisco began to produce the biscuits under the name Vanilla Wafers in 1898. By the 1940s, Vanilla Wafers had become a major ingredient in the Southern cuisine staple banana pudding, and Nabisco began printing a banana pudding recipe on the Vanilla Wafers box. The name of the product was not changed to "Nilla Wafers" until 1967.

In 2013, the brand launched an advertising campaign on Facebook and other social media websites targeted at mothers. It was noted by the New York Times for being unique because Mondelez International, the company that Kraft created to own the brand, decided to spend all of its advertising dollars on social media rather than a combination of advertising platforms. The campaign resulted in a 9% increase in sales for Nilla. Nabisco had previously used other marketing techniques to promote the brand, including in-person events such as sponsoring banana pudding pie eating contests at amusement parks.

Uses 
Nilla wafers are a common ingredient in banana pudding and are consequently very popular in the American South. In Atlanta and Houston, they are consistently in the five best-selling cookie brands.

Nilla wafers and their branding have also made their way into scientific studies. The wafers themselves are commonly used to facilitate the oral administration of various compounds or medications to rats in testing. Nilla's branding has been used to study consumer preferences about variations in packaging.

References

External links

 

Products introduced in 1967
Brand name cookies
Nabisco brands
Mondelez International brands
History of Staten Island